Tears of Buddha is a 1973 documentary film directed by Elliott Hong and filmed by cinematographer Russ Kingston.

Overview
An exploration of South Korea in the fall of 1972 of folk art festivals, competitive games, religious ceremonies, farms, villages and ancient shrines.

See also
 List of American films of 1973

References

External links

1973 films
1973 documentary films
South Korean documentary films
American documentary films
1970s Korean-language films
Documentary films about South Korea
1970s English-language films
1973 multilingual films
American multilingual films
South Korean multilingual films
1970s American films